Walaa Sarwat (born 1960) is an Egyptian chess player.

Career

Razik represented Egypt at the 2006 Chess Olympiad at first reserve, scoring 3 out of 6.

He qualified for the Chess World Cup 2009, where he was defeated by Vugar Gashimov in the first round.

References

External links
 
Walaa Sarwat chess-games at 365Chess.com

1960 births
Living people
Egyptian chess players
Chess Olympiad competitors